Glanyrafon railway station (formerly Glanrafon) is a railway station serving Glanyrafon in Ceredigion in Mid-Wales. It is a request stop on the preserved Vale of Rheidol Railway.

In 2012, an RETB signalling mast, which was part of the Cambrian Line infrastructure, was removed from the station by contractors working for Network Rail, having been in place since the 1980s.

References

Heritage railway stations in Ceredigion
Vale of Rheidol Railway stations
Railway stations in Great Britain opened in 1904
Railway stations in Great Britain closed in 1939
Railway stations in Great Britain opened in 1945